A paratrooper is a military parachutist, or generalized as airborne soldiers.

Paratrooper or variant, may also refer to:

 A military unit named "Paratrooper" or similar; see List of paratrooper forces
 Smokejumper, a firefighter who drops from the sky on parachutes
 Paratrooper (film), a 1953 war film
 Paratrooper (video game), a 1982 video game
 Paratrooper (ride), a type of fairgrounds amusement ride, also called umbrella or parachute ride
 Montague Bikes "Paratrooper" folding Tactical Mountain Bicycle

See also

 Parachutist
 Paratroopers' Day
 Paratroopers' Day (Tajikistan)
 The Paratrooper's Prayer
 Paratrooper helmet
 Paratrooper boots
 
 Trooper (disambiguation)
 Para (disambiguation)

 Starship Troopers (disambiguation)
 Skydiver (disambiguation)